Guz or Huz (Cyrillic: Гуз or Гузь) is a surname that is common in Poland, Belarus, Ukraine, and Russia. It is often transliterated as Huz from Belarusian and Ukrainian.

Notable people with the surname include:
 Aleksandr Guz (born 2004), Belarusian footballer
 Dmitry Guz (born 1988), Russian footballer
 Grigori Guz (born 1985), Russian footballer
 Ihor Huz (born 1982), Ukrainian politician 
 Innocent Guz (1890–1940), Polish Franciscan priest
 Paulina Guz (born 1991), Polish cyclist
 Samuil Guz (1905–1969), Soviet metallurgist
 Savannah Schroll Guz (born 1974), American author and artist
 Viktor Guz (born 1971), Russian football coach and player

See also
 

Polish-language surnames
Russian-language surnames